Blebbishield emergency program is a process which acts as a last line of defense for cancer stem cells after induction of apoptosis where the apoptotic blebs fuse to shield the cells/nucleus from the destructive force of apoptosis by forming blebbishields. Blebbishields in turn fuse to each other and generate cancer stem cell spheres/cellular transformation, essentially shifting the balance of dying cells back towards survival.

Discovery
Blebbishields were first identified in human bladder cancer cell line RT4 (HTB-2: ATCC), referred to as RT4P (RT4 parent) in the initial report.

Blebbishield formation
Every cell type, especially cancer cells, are capable of undergoing apoptosis, a process in which the plasma membrane undergoes blebbing followed by orderly deconstruction of cells into apoptotic bodies. Cancer stem cells have the extraordinary ability to construct blebbishields from these apoptotic bodies by bleb-bleb fusion and form stem cell spheres/cellular transformation by sub-sequent blebbishield-blebbishield fusion. Endocytosis and endocytosis-driven serpentine filopodia are necessary to tether and tie apoptotic bodies to facilitate fusion. The involvement of membrane fusion was confirmed by inhibiting cholesterol using the cholesterol antagonist Filipin-III.

Blebbishields and cancer stem cells
Sphere forming cells widely display characteristics of tumorigenesis. Cells from blebbishield derived spheres are tumorigenic in nature, providing an important clue for tumorigenesis. Blebbishield emergency program is postulated to have the strong rationale for bladder cancer recurrence as it is a potential cause for multifocal/satellite bladder tumors. The blebbishield derived cells exhibit strong drug resistance behavior and exhibit high sensitivity to Hoechst-33342 similar to side-population cells.

Positive and negative regulators of blebbishield survival

Caspases
Caspases (Caspase-3, caspase-8, caspase-9) are found to have important roles in contributing the formation of blebbishields as well as sub-sequent cancer stem cell spheres. Caspase-3 plays a dual role where it is needed for induction of proper apoptosis: to activate Bax and Bak by cleavage to kill the cells and also needed for transformation from blebbishields.

VEGF signaling
VEGF signaling, especially VEGF-A to VEGFR2 signaling plays a commanding role during the transformation from blebbishields. VEGF signaling leads to IRES translation of N-Myc, which in concert with mitochondrial oligomers to boost glycolysis to power blebbishield formation and transformation from blebbishields. Lactic acid, a tumor derived metabolite, altering pH of tumor microenvironment enhances sphere formation from blebbishields positively regulating VEGF bioavailability.

Reactive oxygen species [ROS]
Reactive oxygen species plays a role in cellular transformation. Various PKC isoforms were implicated in p47phox/Nox1 axis mediated ROS generation during cellular transformation. PKC-ζ isoform interaction with p47phox was found to be critical for ROS production and transformation from blebbishields.

Role of mitochondria and Glycolysis in blebbishield emergency program
Protection of mitochondria from outer membrane permeabilization is important to retain the transforming potential of blebbishields. Functional mitochondria lead to uninterrupted glycolysis which in turn protects the blebbishields from secondary necrosis. K-Ras, BAD (phosphorylated at Ser-112), p27, Bax and Bak forms oligomers to boost glycolysis, which in turn overrides secondary necrosis and offer energy required to proceed with the reconstruction process during cellular transformation from blebbishields.

Other factors
N-linked glycosylation and v-ATPase were implicated to have survival roles in blebbishield emergency program.

References

Cancer pathology
Stem cells